The men's 400 metres event at the 2005 Asian Athletics Championships was held in Incheon, South Korea on September 1–3.

Medalists

Results

Heats

Final

References
Results

2005 Asian Athletics Championships
400 metres at the Asian Athletics Championships